The men's Greco-Roman welterweight competition at the 1932 Summer Olympics in Los Angeles took place from 4 August to 7 August at the Grand Olympic Auditorium. Nations were limited to one competitor. It was the first appearance of the event; at the previous two Olympics, the welterweight class had been exclusive to freestyle wrestling. This weight class was limited to wrestlers weighing up to 72 kg.

This Greco-Roman wrestling competition followed the same format that was introduced at the 1928 Summer Olympics, using an elimination system based on the accumulation of points. Each round featured all wrestlers pairing off and wrestling one bout (with one wrestler having a bye if there were an odd number). The loser received 3 points. The winner received 1 point if the win was by decision and 0 points if the win was by fall. At the end of each round, any wrestler with at least 5 points was eliminated.

Schedule

Results

Round 1

Johansson and Kajander won by fall, earning 0 points in the first round. Jensen and Käpp won by decision, earning 1 point. Dahl, Gallegati, and Yoshida's losses put them at 3 points each, while Zombori was injured in his loss and abandoned the competition.

 Bouts

 Points

Round 2

Johansson and Kajander both stayed at 0 points, the former with a second win by fall and the latter with a bye. Kapp won a second consecutive bout by decision, earning a second point; the other decision-winner from the first round, Jensen, lost to move to 4 points. Gallegati stayed at 3 points by following his initial loss with a win by fall. Dahl and Yoshida were both eliminated at 0–2.

 Bouts

 Points

Round 3

Johansson (3–0) and Kajander (2–0 with a bye) both stayed perfect, with all wins by fall. Their opponents in this round, Käpp and Jensen, both were eliminated. Gallegati moved on with 3 points still after a bye in this round.

 Bouts

 Points

Round 4

Johansson and Kajander still had all of their wins by fall, with Kajander eliminating Gallegati and Johansson having a bye.

 Bouts

 Points

Final round

In the bout between the last two wrestlers, each of whom had won all previous bouts by fall, Johansson won by decision.

 Bouts

 Points

References

Wrestling at the 1932 Summer Olympics